These are the number-one singles of 1969 according to the Top 100 Singles chart in Cashbox magazine.

See also 
1969 in music
List of Hot 100 number-one singles of 1969 (U.S.)

References 
https://web.archive.org/web/20080304153417/http://cashboxmagazine.com/archives/60s_files/1969.html
https://web.archive.org/web/20080101114714/http://musicseek.info/no1hits/1969.htm

1969
1969 record charts
1969 in American music